Johan Kriek was the defending champion.

Kriek successfully defended his title, defeating Brian Teacher 6–7, 7–6, 6–4 in the final.

Seeds

  Johan Kriek (champion)
  Brian Teacher (final)
  Tom Gullikson (second round)
  John Fitzgerald (third round)
  Brian Gottfried (second round)
  Tim Gullikson (quarterfinals)
  Gianni Ocleppo (third round)
  Nduka Odizor (semifinals)
  Brad Drewett (second round)
  Ramesh Krishnan (third round)
  Ben Testerman (second round)
  Wally Masur (second round)
  Miloslav Mečíř (third round)
  Emilio Sánchez (second round)
  Robert Van't Hof (third round)
  Marty Davis (quarterfinals)

Draw

Finals

Top half

Section 1

Section 2

Bottom half

Section 3

Section 4

External links
 Main draw

1984 Grand Prix (tennis)
1984 Bristol Open